Apechtes mexicanus is a species of beetle in the family Cerambycidae. It was described by Thomson in 1860. It is known from Guatemala, Honduras and Mexico.

References

Colobotheini
Beetles described in 1860